The 2019–20 Vanderbilt Commodores men's basketball team represented Vanderbilt University in the 2019–20 NCAA Division I men's basketball season. They were coached by Jerry Stackhouse in his first season at Vanderbilt. The Commodores played their home games at Memorial Gymnasium in Nashville, Tennessee as members of the Southeastern Conference. They finished the season 11–21, 3–15 in SEC play to finish in last place. They lost in the first round of the SEC tournament to Arkansas.

Following a 90–64 loss to South Carolina on January 25, Vanderbilt tied Sewanee for the most consecutive conference losses in SEC history, 24, which was set from 1938 to 1940.

In the following game at Kentucky on January 29, the Commodores broke the SEC record for consecutive conference losses with 25.

Previous season
They finished the season 9–23, 0–18 in SEC play to finish in 14th place. They are the first SEC team to go winless in a season since the 1953-1954 Georgia Tech team, and the first team ever in the 18 game conference schedule. They followed this winless in conference play season with a loss to Texas A&M in the first round of the SEC tournament, extending their losing streak to 20 games, to finish the season with a combined 0-19 conference record. As a result of the unprecedented season, third-year head coach Bryce Drew was fired on March 22, 2019.

Offseason

Departures

Incoming transfers

2019 recruiting class

×

Preseason

SEC media poll
The SEC media poll was released on October 15, 2019.

Roster

Schedule

|-
!colspan=12 style=|Exhibition

|-
!colspan=12 style=|Non-conference regular season

|-
!colspan=12 style=|SEC regular season

|-
!colspan=12 style=| SEC tournament

See also 

 2019–20 Vanderbilt Commodores women's basketball team

References 

Vanderbilt
Vanderbilt Commodores men's basketball seasons
Vanderbilt Commodores men's basketball
Vanderbilt Commodores men's basketball